The 1935 Cornell Big Red football team was an American football team that represented Cornell University during the 1935 college football season.  In their 16th and final season under head coach Gil Dobie, the Big Red compiled a 0–6–1 record and were outscored by their opponents by a combined total of 201 to 59.

Schedule

References

Cornell
Cornell Big Red football seasons
College football winless seasons
Cornell Big Red football